The Samsung NX300M is a rangefinder-styled digital mirrorless camera announced by Samsung on January 3, 2013. It was the first consumer product based on the Tizen operating system. Its other upgrades over the NX300 model include increased rotation range for the tiltable display, allowing it to be put into a 180 degree "selfie" position. It was initially on sale in South Korea only, and its containing the Tizen operating system was not revealed until almost a month later.

References

http://www.dpreview.com/products/samsung/slrs/samsung_nx300m/specifications

Live-preview digital cameras
NX 300M
Cameras introduced in 2013